This is a list of Royal Navy ship names starting with R, S, and T.

R

 
 
 
 
 
 
 
 
 
 
 Raby Castle
 
 
 Rachel
 
 
 
 
 
 
 
 
 
 
 
 
 
 
 
 
 
 
 
 

 
 
 
 Rattle
 
 
 
 
 
 
 Rayleigh Castle
 
 
 
 Rebecca
 
 Recovery
 
 Red Lion
 
 
 
 
 
 
 
 
 
 
 
 
 
 
 
 
 
 
 Renommee
 Renonculus
 
 Republican
 
 
 
 
 
 
 
 
 
 
 
 
 
 Reunion
 
 
 
 
 Reynard
 Rhin
 
 Rhona
 
 
 
 
 
 
 
 
 
 Ripley
 
 
 Rippon's Prize
 
 
 Rivoli
 
 
 
 
 Roc
 
 Rochester Prize
 
 
 Rockingham
 Rockrose
 
 
 
 
 
 
 
 Rolls Royce
 Roman
 
 
 
 
 
 
 
 
 Rosamund
 
 Rosaura
 

 
 Rosebush
 Rosemary

 
 
 
 
 
 
 
 Roxborough
 
 
 
 
 
 
 
 
 
 Royal Eagle

 
 
 
 Royal Marine
 
 Royal Prince
 
 
 
 
 
 
 
 
 
 
 Rupert's Prize
 
 
 
 
 Ryde

S

 
 
 
 S6
 S7
 S8
 S9
 
 
 
 
 
 Safari
 
 Safety
 Saga
 Sahib
 
 
 
 
 
 Salamine
 
 
 
 
 
 
 
 
 
 
 
 
 
 
 
 San Juan
 
 
 
 
 
 
 
 
 
 
 
 
 Sapphire II
 
 
 
 
 Sardine
 
 
 
 
 
 
 
 
 
 
 
 
 
 
 
 
 
 
 
 
 
 
 
 
 
 
 
 
 
 
 
 
 
 
 
 
 
 
 
 
 
 
 
 
 
 
 
 
 
 
 
 
 Senator
 
 
 
 
 
 
 
 
 
 
 Sesame
 Sesostris
 Setter
 Seven Sisters
 Seven Stars
 Sevenoaks
 
 
 
 
 
 
 
 
 
 
 
 
 
 
 
 
 
 
 
 
 
 
 
 
 
 
 
 
 
 
 
 
 
 Simbang
 
 
 Sir Andrew Mitchell
 Sir Edward Hughes
 
 
 

 
 
 
 
 Sirene
 
 
 
 Skilful
 
 
 Skylark
 Sladen
 Slaney
 
 Sligo
 
 Slothany
 
 
 
 
 
 
 
 
 
 
 
 
 
 
 
 
 
 
 
 
 
 
 
 
 
 
 
 
 
 
 
 
 
 Spark
 
 
 
 
 
 
 
 
 
 
 
 
 
 
 
 
 
 
 Sphynx
 
  
 
 
 
 
 
 
 
 
 
 
 
 
 
 
 
 
 
 
 
 
 
 
 
 
 St Christopher's
 
 St Erth
 
 
 
 
 
 
 
 
 
 
 
 
 
 
 
 
 
 
 
 
 
 
 
 
 
 
 Starr
 
 
 
 
 
 
 
 
 
 
 
 
 
 Sterling
 
 
 
 
 
 
 
 
 
 
 
 
 Strathella
 
 
 Stromboli
 
 
 
 
 
 
 
 
 
 
 
 
 
 
 
 

 
 
 
 
 
 
 
 Superbe
 
 
 
 
 
 
 
 Surprize
 Surveillante
 
 
 
 
 
 
 
 
 
 Swann
 
 
 
 
 
 
 
 
 Sycamore
 
 
 
 Syren

T

 
 
 
 
 
 Tain
 
 
 
 
 
 
 
 
 
 
 
 
 
 
 
 
 
 
 
 
 
 
 
 
 
 
 Tasman
 Tasmania
 
 Taunton
 
 
 
 Tavy
 
 
 
 
 
 
 
 
 
 
 
 
 
 
 
 
 
 
 
 
 
 
 Terror
 
 
 
 
 
 
 
 
 
 
 
 
 
 
 Theodocia
 
 
 
 
 
 Thor
 
 
 
 
 
 
 
 
 
 
 
 
 
 
 
 
 
 
 
 
 
 
 
 
 
 Tintagel
 
 
 
 
 
 
 
 
 
 Tobruk
 
 
 
 Tonbridge Castle
 
 
 Toowoomba 
 
 
 
 
 Tormentor 
 
 
 
 
 
 Torride
 Torridge
 
 Tortoise
 
 
 
 Totnes
 
 
 Toutou
 
 
 Towser
 Towy
 
 
 
 
 
 
 
 
 Transporter
 
 Trave
 
 Tredagh
 
 
 
 
 
 
 
 
 
 
 
 
 
 
 
 
 Trincomalee
 
 
 
 
 
 Trojan
 
 Tromp
 
 
 
 
 
 
 
 
 
 
 
 
 
 
 Tryall
 Trydent
 Tryphon
 Tryton
 
 
 
 
 
 
 
 
 
 Tutankhamen
 
 
 
 
 
 
 
 Tyrant

See also
 List of aircraft carriers of the Royal Navy
 List of amphibious warfare ships of the Royal Navy
 List of battlecruisers of the Royal Navy
 List of pre-dreadnought battleships of the Royal Navy
 List of dreadnought battleships of the Royal Navy
 List of cruiser classes of the Royal Navy
 List of destroyer classes of the Royal Navy
 List of patrol vessels of the Royal Navy
 List of frigate classes of the Royal Navy
 List of mine countermeasure vessels of the Royal Navy (includes minesweepers and mine hunters)
 List of monitors of the Royal Navy
 List of Royal Fleet Auxiliary ship names
 List of Royal Navy shore establishments
 List of submarines of the Royal Navy
 List of survey vessels of the Royal Navy

References

 

 R
Names R
Royal Navy R
Royal Navy ships R